Thornton Randall Philip Hosking (4 May 1894 - 6 August 1949) was an Australian rules footballer who played with Melbourne in the Victorian Football League (VFL).

Family
The son of John Andrew Hosking (1860-1936), and Sarah Letitia Hosking (1863-1928), née Pearson, Thornton Randall Philip Hosking was born at Albert Park, Victoria on 4 May 1894.

Two of his brothers, Albert Jeffrey Hosking (1885-1953), and John Bruce "Jack" Hosking (1898-1917), also served in the AIF. Jack died of the wounds he received in action, in France, on 22 July 1917.

He married Ettie Ruby Meade Menere (1891-1956), later Mrs. Bruce Duane, on 13 August 1913. They had one son. Following a divorce, he married Mona Gwenn Bromley Lloyd (1903-1984), later Mrs. Charles Trevor Turner, in 1939.

Football
Recruited from South Yarra, he played of First XVIII for Melbourne, against Collingwood, at the MCG, on 26 April 1913.

Military service
He served overseas with the First AIF: and, while in England, took part in the Pioneer Exhibition Game, at Queen's Club, West Kensington, on 28 October 1916.

Death
He died at his residence in South Caulfield on  6 August 1949.

See also
 1916 Pioneer Exhibition Game

Notes

References
 
 Apprehensions: Thornton Hosking, New South Wales Police Gazette and Weekly Record of Crime,  No.41, (Wednesday, 11 October 1911), p.380.
 Charged with Theft: Committed for Trial, The Barrier Miner, (Wednesday, 4 October 1911) p.8.
 Quarter Sessions: Pleaded Guilty, The Sydney Morning Herald, (Friday, 13 October 1911), p.5.
 Quarter Sessions: Sentenced, The Sydney Morning Herald, (Saturday, 14 October 1911), p.14.
 "No.12041, Thornton Hosking, 12-10-1911", Gaol Description and Entrance Books, 1818-1930, New South Wales, Australia, at ancestry.com.au (subscription only). 
 Return of Prisoners Discharged to Freedom or On License: Thornton Hosking, New South Wales Police Gazette and Weekly Record of Crime, No.30, (Wednesday, 24 July 1912), p.298.
 First World War Embarkation Roll: Private Thornton Phillip (sic) Hosking (4137), collection of the Australian War Memorial.
 First World War Nominal Roll: Corporal Thornton Philip Hosking (4137), collection of the Australian War Memorial.
 First World War Service Record: Corporal Thornton Philip Hosking (4137), National Archives of Australia.

External links 
 
 
 Phil Hosking, at Demonwiki.

1894 births
1949 deaths
Australian rules footballers from Melbourne
Melbourne Football Club players
Participants in "Pioneer Exhibition Game" (London, 28 October 1916)
Australian military personnel of World War I
People from Albert Park, Victoria
Military personnel from Melbourne